Johannes Avetaranian (Erzurum, Ottoman Empire, 30 June 1861 – Wiesbaden, Germany, 11 December 1919), born Muhammad Shukri, was, according to his autobiography, a Turkish descendant of the Islamic prophet Muhammad. Avetaranian was originally a mullah in Turkey who converted from Islam to Christianity, and later became a missionary for the Swedish Mission Covenant Church in Southern Xinjiang (1892–1938). He translated the New Testament into the Uyghur language. He preached Christianity in Xinjiang and at a Swedish Protestant mission. He died in 1919, aged 58, in Wiesbaden.

Biography

Avetaranian was born in Erzurum, in 1861, to a Muslim family. His mother was deaf, blind, and mute, and died when Avetaranian was only two years old. His father was a dervish.

He took the Armenian name of Johannes (John) Avetaranian (Avetaran means 'Gospel') and was baptised in Tiflis, Russia (modern-day Tbilisi, Georgia) on 28 February 1885.

He was the first person from the Mission Union of Sweden to stay in Kashgar (in 1892).

He left Kashgar in 1897, thinking that he would soon return, but that did not work out. Instead he worked with the German Orient Mission (DOM) in Bulgaria, where he started a Christian newspaper, Gunesh, in Turkish. The newspaper was circulated in Turkey proper.

Gösta Raquette came to Philipopol, now Plovdiv, Bulgaria, where he worked with Avetaranian on revision of the Bible translation.

Muslim origins
In his biography "A Muslim Who Became a Christian", Aveteranian states to have been unaware of his descent from Muhammad, until a trip with his father to Erzurum. During the trip, Aveteranian and his father had put on the Green turbans, to which only the Sayyids or descendants of Muhammad are entitled. Prior to this, he had only worn this once in his childhood. The Green turban had been a gift which was presented to him by his maternal aunt. A local mullah was astonished to see the green turban, and inquired as to from where he had obtained it. Then he requested Aveteranian to ask whether his aunt was aware that only Sayyids were entitled to wear green turbans. He did so, and the next day, his aunt went to the mullah and clarified the mullah's doubts as to their descent when she revealed her father's name. After this incident, Aveteranian gained respect from the mullah, who would always defer to him, while in Avetaranian's presence.

References 

Avateranian, Johannes & Bechard, John (tr); A Muslim Who Became A Christian (Hertford: Authors Online Ltd.)

External links 
 A Muslim who became a Christian by John Bechard (English translation).

Converts to Protestantism from Islam
Lutheran missionaries in China
Protestant missionaries in Bulgaria
People from Erzurum
Translators of the Bible into Uyghur
Christian missionaries in Central Asia
1861 births
1919 deaths
Turkish Lutheran missionaries
Turkish former Muslims
Hashemite people
19th-century translators
Lutheran missionaries in Asia
Lutheran missionaries in Europe
Protestant missionaries in the Ottoman Empire
19th-century Lutherans
Missionary linguists